KOKT may refer to:

 KOKT-LP, a low-power radio station (90.9 FM) licensed to serve Tulsa, Oklahoma, United States
 KOKT-LP (defunct), a defunct low-power television station (channel 20) formerly licensed to serve Sulphur, Oklahoma